The Spain Masters is an annual badminton tournament held in Spain. This tournament is part of the BWF World Tour tournaments and is leveled in BWF World Tour Super 300.

Venue & host city 
 2018–2020: Pavelló de la Vall d'Hebron, Barcelona.
 2021: Palacio de los Deportes Carolina Marín, Huelva.
 2023: Centro Deportivo Municipal Gallur, Madrid.

Past winners

Performances by nation

References 

 
Badminton tournaments in Spain
BWF World Tour